Charles William Schroll was an American football linebacker in the National Football League. He was drafted in the fourteenth round of the 1948 NFL Draft by the Los Angeles Rams and later played with the Detroit Lions during the 1950 NFL season. The following season, he played with the Green Bay Packers. He also played with the Buffalo Bills of the All-America Football Conference in 1949.

References

External links

1926 births
2009 deaths
Sportspeople from Alexandria, Louisiana
Players of American football from Louisiana
Detroit Lions players
Green Bay Packers players
Buffalo Bills (AAFC) players
American football linebackers
LSU Tigers football players